Hill End railway station was on the Great Northern Railway branch from  to St Albans in Hertfordshire, England.

History

The station, which was intended to service Hill End Hospital, opened on 1 August 1899, and closed on 1 October 1951.

References

Disused railway stations in Hertfordshire
Former Great Northern Railway stations
Railway stations in Great Britain opened in 1899
Railway stations in Great Britain closed in 1951
Transport in St Albans